Plasmodium gabaldoni is a parasite of the genus Plasmodium subgenus Giovannolaia.

Like all Plasmodium species P. gabaldoni has both vertebrate and insect hosts. The vertebrate hosts for this parasite are birds.

Description 

The parasite was first described by Garnham in 1977.

Geographical occurrence 

This parasite is found in Venezuela.

Clinical features and host pathology 

P. gabaldoni infects muscovy ducks (Cairina moschata) and rock pigeons (Columba livia).

References 

gabaldoni
Parasites of birds